"This is the Girl" was the first single from British rapper Kano's second studio album London Town and the first from British singer Craig David's fourth studio album Trust Me. The song was released in 2007 and reached its peak of number 18 in the UK charts on 18 September 2007.

The song samples lyrics from Jay Z's song "Big Pimpin'", which Jay Z says, "Under the canopy, my stamina be enough for Pamela Anderson Lee", which Kano says instead, "Under the canopy, my stamina be enough for Angelina Jolie".

Music video
The music video starts off with Kano finishing rapping "London Town" in a concert, then the music of "This Is The Girl" starts, while Kano is writing the lyrics for the song with headphones on. The rest of the video has Kano and Craig David performing in a studio and Kano on a tour bus, with girls coming up to him, but he rejects them. Directed by Paul Minor.

Formats and track listings

UK CD:
 "This Is the Girl" (radio edit)
 "P's & Q's" (live)

UK 7" vinyl:
 "This Is the Girl" (album version)

UK 12" vinyl:
 "This Is the Girl" (radio edit)
 "This Is the Girl" (album version)
 "F*** the Chorus"
 "F*** the Chorus" (instrumental)

Chart performance

"This Is the Girl" peaked at number eighteen on the UK Singles Chart and is Kano's highest-charting single in the UK, spending ten weeks inside the UK top 75, only one week less than David's second single from Trust Me, "Hot Stuff (Let's Dance)", which peaked inside the top ten.

References

Craig David songs
Kano (rapper) songs
2007 singles
Songs written by Fraser T. Smith
Songs written by Craig David
Song recordings produced by Fraser T. Smith
2007 songs
Songs written by Kano (rapper)
679 Artists singles